Epupa Falls (also known as Monte Negro Falls in Angola) is a series of large waterfalls formed by the Cunene River on the border of Angola and Namibia, in the Kaokoland area of the Kunene Region. The settlement near the falls is also called Epupa.

Toponymy
The name "Epupa" is a Herero word for "foam", in reference to the foam created by the falling water. The Epupa Constituency is named for the falls.

Ecology
Due to the specialised nature of this steep riparian habitat, the Epupa Falls are the locus of endemism for a number of fish and other aquatic species.

Access
Despite being difficult to reach (a four-wheel drive vehicle is recommended to reach them from Opuwo), the falls are a major visitor attraction in Namibia because of the largely unspoiled environment, with fig trees, baobabs, makalani palms, and coloured rock walls framing the falls. 

There are four lodges accommodating visitors to the area, namely Kapika Waterfall Lodge, Omarunga Camp Lodge, Epupa Camp Lodge, and Epupa Falls Campsite Lodge. All these lodges have campsites except Kapika Waterfall Lodge plus Motjikutu campsite, which is a locally owned campsite.

Activities in the area range from guided tours to the falls and Himba villages around Epupa Falls, birdwatching, excursions to see crocodiles, and a variety of vegetation featuring trees like baobab and Mopane trees, the dominant species in the area. Tourists are also offered whitewater rafting at Epupa Camp.

People
Epupa Falls is known for the semi-nomadic Ovahimba people as well as other tribes like the Ovatjimba, Ovazemba, and Ovatwa people. Migration to Epupa Falls is constantly increasing due to high tourism growth, which further sees tribes of Herero- and Ovambo-speaking peoples migrate to the area.

In the media
Epupa Falls are featured in the 8th episode of the first season of The Grand Tour, being the termination point of a journey in beach buggies through Namibia.

References

Sources

 C.Michael Hogan. 2012. Kunene River. eds. P.Saundry & C.Cleveland. Encyclopedia of Earth. National Council for Science and the Environment. Washington DC.

Waterfalls of Namibia
Waterfalls of Angola
Otjiherero words and phrases
Angola–Namibia border
International waterfalls